Skafså is a parish in southern part of the municipality Tokke in Telemark, Norway. The Skafså Church was consecrated in 1839. The mountain farm Grimdalen, today a museum (Grimdalstunet), has farm buildings from the time of barter economy in the 17th century. Nearby is a collection of around 300 of Anne Grimdalen's sculptures.

People from Skafså
 Talleiv Huvestad  (1761–1847) a Norwegian teacher, farmer and politician
 Vetle Vislie (1858–1933) a Norwegian educationalist and writer
 Anne Grimdalen  (1899–1961) a Norwegian sculptor
 Arvid Torgeir Lie (1938–2020) a Norwegian poet, writer of short stories and translator

References

Populated places in Vestfold og Telemark
Tokke